Federal-style architecture is the name for the classicizing architecture built in the newly founded United States between  1780 and 1830, and particularly from 1785 to 1815, which was heavily based on the works of Andrea Palladio with several innovations on Palladian architecture by Thomas Jefferson and his contemporaries first for Jefferson's Monticello estate and followed by many examples in government building throughout the United States. An excellent example of this is the White House. This style shares its name with its era, the Federalist Era. The name  Federal style is also used in association with furniture design in the United States of the same time period. The style broadly corresponds to the classicism of Biedermeier style in the German-speaking lands, Regency architecture in Britain, and to the French Empire style. It may also be termed Adamesque architecture. The White House and Monticello were setting stones for federal architecture. 

In the early American republic, the founding generation consciously chose to associate the nation with the ancient democracies of Greece and the republican values of Rome. Grecian aspirations informed the Greek Revival, lasting into the 1850s. Using Roman architectural vocabulary, the Federal style applied to the balanced and symmetrical version of Georgian architecture that had been practiced in the American colonies' new motifs of neoclassical architecture as it was epitomized in Britain by Robert Adam, who published his designs in 1792.

Characteristics
American Federal architecture typically uses plain surfaces with attenuated detail, usually isolated in panels, tablets, and friezes. It also had a flatter, smoother façade and rarely used pilasters. It was most influenced by the interpretation of ancient Roman architecture, fashionable after the unearthing of Pompeii and Herculaneum. The bald eagle was a common symbol used in this style, with the ellipse a frequent architectural motif.

The classicizing manner of constructions and town planning undertaken by the federal government was expressed in early federal projects of lighthouses, harbor buildings, universities, and hospitals. It can be seen in the rationalizing, urbanistic layout of L'Enfant Plan of Washington and in the Commissioners' Plan of 1811 in New York. The historic eastern part of Bleecker Street in New York, between Broadway and the Bowery, is home to Federal-style row houses at 7 to 13 and 21 to 25 Bleecker Street. The classicizing style of Federal architecture can especially be seen in the quintessential New England meeting house, with their lofty and complex towers by architects such as Lavius Fillmore and Asher Benjamin.

This American neoclassical high style was the idiom of America's first professional architects, such as Charles Bulfinch and Minard Lafever. Robert Adam and James Adam were leading influences through their books.

Legacy of Federal architecture in Salem, Massachusetts

Architects of the Federal period
 Asher Benjamin
 Charles Bulfinch
 John Holden Greene
 James Hoban
 Thomas Jefferson
 Minard Lafever
 Benjamin Latrobe
 Pierre L'Enfant
 John McComb Jr.
 Samuel McIntire
 Robert Mills
 Alexander Parris
 William Strickland
 Martin E. Thompson
 William Thornton
 Ithiel Town
 Ammi B. Young
Modern reassessment of the American architecture of the Federal period began with Fiske Kimball.

See also
 Adam style
 Boscobel (Garrison, New York)
 Hamilton Grange National Memorial
 List of houses in Fairmount Park
 Lyre arm
 Manasseh Cutler Hall
 Morris–Jumel Mansion

References

Further reading
 Craig, Lois A., The Federal Presence: Architecture, Politics and National Design. The MIT Press: 1984. .

External links
 Definition of Federal-style architecture
 Introduction to Federal-style architecture
 Federal Style, 1780-1820 - Coleman-Hollister House
 Federal Style Patterns 1780-1820 Bibliography for federal style research, photographs of federal houses, federal style pattern book.

 
18th-century architecture in the United States
19th-century architecture in the United States
American architectural styles
House styles
Federal
.